Pettygrove Park is a city park in downtown Portland, Oregon, United States. It is the second park in a series of urban open spaces designed by American landscape architect Lawrence Halprin in the South Auditorium District urban renewal area. The soft mounds of landscaping are responsible for the park's nickname of 'Mae West Park'.

Description and history

Pettygrove Park is bounded on all sides by pedestrian malls, which connect to other parks, including Keller Fountain Park and Lovejoy Plaza. The park is characterized by a dense tree canopy which shades a core of internal asphalt pathways pivoting along grassy berms and basalt stone walls. At the southeast corner of the park, a reflecting pool and sculpture serve as a focal point for pedestrians. The sculpture, called The Dreamer, was designed by Manuel Izquierdo and commissioned by the Portland Development Commission in 1979.

The park was named for Francis Pettygrove, one of the early settlers of the Portland townsite. The same coin used by Pettygrove and settler Asa Lovejoy to determine whether the city would be named Portland or Boston was flipped to determine which park in the open-space sequence would be Lovejoy and which would be Pettygrove.

See also 
 List of parks in Portland, Oregon

References 

1966 establishments in Oregon
Parks in Portland, Oregon
Protected areas established in 1966
Southwest Portland, Oregon
Urban public parks